Leucargyra xanthoceps is a moth in the family Crambidae. It was described by George Hampson in 1919. It is found in Peru.

The wingspan is about 50 mm for males and 74 mm for females. The wings are uniform silvery white.

References

Moths described in 1919
Schoenobiinae